Cranks Creek Lake is a  reservoir in Harlan County, Kentucky. It was created in 1963.

References

Infrastructure completed in 1963
Protected areas of Harlan County, Kentucky
Reservoirs in Kentucky
Buildings and structures in Harlan County, Kentucky
Bodies of water of Harlan County, Kentucky